The white shiner (Luxilus albeolus) is a freshwater ray-finned fish in the family Cyprinidae, the carps and minnows. It occurs on the Atlantic Slope from the Chowan River system in Virginia to the Cape Fear River drainage in North Carolina to the upper New River drainage in West Virginia, Virginia and North Carolina. Its preferred habitat is rocky and sandy pools and runs of headwaters, creeks and small rivers.

References

Luxilus
Freshwater fish of the United States
Fish described in 1889